The 2013 Discover Orange Bowl was a college football bowl game played on Tuesday, January 1, 2013, at Sun Life Stadium in Miami Gardens, Florida. The game was organized by the Orange Bowl committee. The Orange Bowl featured ACC champions Florida State versus at-large selection and MAC champions Northern Illinois.  The game was part of the 2012–2013 Bowl Championship Series and was the second of the series to be played, following the 2013 Rose Bowl.  Florida State won the game by a score of 31–10.

The Florida State Seminoles clinched a berth in the 2013 Orange Bowl by winning the 2012 ACC Championship. The Northern Illinois Huskies became the first MAC team to earn a BCS berth by being the 15th ranked team in the nation. A school from a BCS non-automatic qualifying conference earns a bid if in the top sixteen and ranked ahead of a champion from an automatic qualifying conference. The Huskies, winners of the 2012 MAC Championship Game, became the first team from the MAC to make a BCS bowl.

Teams

Northern Illinois

Florida State

Scoring summary

Statistics

References

Orange Bowl
Orange Bowl
Florida State Seminoles football bowl games
Northern Illinois Huskies football bowl games
Orange Bowl
January 2013 sports events in the United States